Unlike the 4 other largest municipalities  of Denmark, Esbjerg, the 5th largest, is less of a stronghold for parties of the traditional red bloc, and is more of a slightly blue municipality.

However, the Social Democrats targeted the municipality for a potential flip of the mayor position, after Venstre had held it since 1994. Political analyst Hans Redder argued that the Social Democrats saw it as a traditional labour municipality. Added to that, the blue bloc won 16 seats against 15 in the last election.

This attempt by the Social Democrats failed in a fairly large scale . They lost 2 sets, while Venstre gained 2, and the blue bloc went from 16 to 18 seats. It later confirmed that Jesper Frost Rasmussen from Venstre would continue for a second term.

Electoral system
For elections to Danish municipalities, a number varying from 9 to 31 are chosen to be elected to the municipal council. The seats are then allocated using the D'Hondt method and a closed list proportional representation.
Esbjerg Municipality had 31 seats in 2021

Unlike in Danish General Elections, in elections to municipal councils, electoral alliances are allowed.

Electoral alliances  

Electoral Alliance 1

Electoral Alliance 2

Results

Notes

References 

Esbjerg